Leighton Smith may refer to:
 Lawrence Leighton Smith (born 1936), American conductor and pianist 
 Leighton Smith (radio host) (born 1947), Australia-born New Zealand radio broadcaster 
 Leighton W. Smith Jr. (born 1939), American admiral